Casimir Joseph Banaszek (October 24, 1945 – December 4, 2019) was a professional American football offensive lineman who played ten seasons with the San Francisco 49ers. He played his college football at Northwestern University, and was named to the Chicagoland Sports Hall of Fame. Casimir passed from Glioblastoma in December 2019.

References

1945 births
2019 deaths
Players of American football from Chicago
American football offensive tackles
Northwestern Wildcats football players
San Francisco 49ers players